Raghbir Lal Sharma (born 15 November 1929) was an Indian hockey player.

References
Raghbir Lal's profile at databaseOlympics

External links
 

1929 births
Living people
Field hockey players from Punjab, India
Olympic field hockey players of India
Olympic gold medalists for India
Field hockey players at the 1952 Summer Olympics
Field hockey players at the 1956 Summer Olympics
Indian male field hockey players
Olympic medalists in field hockey
Medalists at the 1956 Summer Olympics
Medalists at the 1952 Summer Olympics
Field hockey players from Rawalpindi